Arne Hovde (28 September 1914 – 12 December 1935 ) was Norwegian ski jumper who competed in the early 1930s. He won a silver medal in the ski jumping individual large hill at the 1934 FIS Nordic World Ski Championships in Sollefteå.

External links

Norwegian male ski jumpers
1914 births
1935 deaths
FIS Nordic World Ski Championships medalists in ski jumping
20th-century Norwegian people